Consigliere (plural ) is a position within the leadership structure of the Sicilian, Calabrian, and Italian-American Mafia. The word was popularized in English by the novel The Godfather (1969) and its film adaptation. In the novel, a consigliere is an advisor or counselor to the boss, with the additional responsibility of representing the boss in important meetings both within the boss's crime family and with other crime families.

The consigliere is a close, trusted friend and confidant, the mob's version of an elder statesman. They are an advisor to the boss in a Mafia crime family, and sometimes is their "right-hand man". By the very nature of the job, a consigliere is one of the few in the family who can argue with the boss, and is often tasked with challenging the boss when needed, to ensure subsequent plans are foolproof. In some depictions, he is devoid of ambition and dispenses disinterested advice. This passive image of the consigliere does not correspond with what little is known of real-life consiglieri.

The boss, underboss, and consigliere constitute the top three positions and a three-man ruling panel, or "administration".

Etymology

In Italian, consigliere means "advisor" or "counselor" and is still a common title for members of city councils in Italy and Switzerland. It is derived from the Latin consiliarius (advisor) and consilium (advice). The terminology of the American Mafia is taken from that of the Sicilian Mafia, and suggests that an analogy is intended to imitate the court of a medieval Italian principality. For example, Venice was led by a doge ("duke") and a consigliere ducale (advisor to the doge).

An underboss will normally move up to boss when the position becomes vacant, so his position is equivalent to that of an heir to the throne. Consigliere, meanwhile, is analogous to chief minister or chancellor. In the novel The Godfather the word is spelled consigliori. In the films, it is clearly pronounced consigliere. Joe Bonanno explains in his book A Man of Honor that a consigliere is more the voice or representative of the soldiers of the family, and that he may help to mediate in or resolve disputes on behalf of the lower echelons of the family.

American Mafia
Joe Valachi mentions a mysterious "Sandino" arbitrating disputes as the Genovese family consigliere in the 1940s. Consiglieri in more recent times have tended to take a more active role in family affairs. In 1971, Colombo family consigliere Joseph Yacovelli directed a murder campaign against renegade Colombo family soldier Joseph "Crazy Joe" Gallo. Two decades later, another Colombo consigliere, Carmine Sessa, led a hit team that attempted to assassinate the acting boss, Victor Orena. 

Frank Bompensiero was appointed consigliere of the Los Angeles crime family in 1976, only to be murdered in a public phone booth in February 1977. His boss had promoted Bompensiero so as to induce him to let his guard down. Electronic surveillance in 1979 recorded New England Mafia boss Raymond L.S. Patriarca talking about appointing his consigliere, so the position need not be chosen as a result of a consensus-seeking process. 

When New Jersey consigliere Stefano "Steve the Truck Driver" Vitabile discovered in 1992 that his family's underboss, John "Johnny Boy" D'Amato, was bisexual, he ordered him killed. Paul Gulino, a drug dealer and associate of the Bonanno crime family, was murdered in 1993 after he allegedly "put hands" on his family's consigliere Anthony Spero.

James Ida, the current Genovese consigliere, has been serving a life sentence since 1996. Dominick Cirillo is the family's acting consigliere. Joseph Corozzo is the current Gambino consigliere, while Anthony Rabito is consigliere for the Bonanno crime family. As these examples illustrate, modern consiglieri are generally former soldiers and capos, not outside advisors.

Notable consigliere 

 Mike Miranda
 Joseph N. Gallo
 Dominick Cirillo
 Ilario Zannino
 Anthony Graziano
 Christopher Furnari
 Anthony Spero
 Joseph DiNapoli

References

Further reading

 Capeci, Jerry. The Complete Idiot's Guide to the Mafia. Indianapolis: Alpha Books, 2002. .

Organized crime members by role
 
American Mafia
Sicilian Mafia